The 2023 World Athletics Label Road Races are road running competitions scheduled for 2023 that have met a certain standard for World Athletics to include the race in its Label Road Races program. The list contained 238 races, nearly 20 more than in 2022, and included 14 Platinum Label, 38 Gold Label, 66 Elite Label, and 120 Label races. World Athletics stated that the additional funding afforded by the Label Road Races program would allow the Athletics Integrity Unit to improve the system it uses to detect drug use in competitions.

Races

See also 
 List of World Athletics Label marathon races
 World Marathon Majors

Notes

References

External links 
 Official website

World Athletics Label Road Races
World Athletics Label Road Races
Label Road Races